Arm Yourself is the second album of Long Island rock band BulletProof Messenger. This album crowdfunded through Sellaband. The album was recorded, engineered, and mixed by Anthony “Rocky” Gallo and mastered by Howie Weinberg at Masterdisk. The album was recorded in 2008 and released January 30, 2009.

Track listing 

The song "Break Outside" is only available on the limited edition version of this Album.

Personnel 
 Marcus Klavan - Vocal
 Matt Litwin - DJ/Electronics
 Voley Martin - Guitar
 Alex Straiter - Drums
 Jesse Downing - Bass
 Scott Martin - Guitar

References 

BulletProof Messenger albums
2009 albums